Nancy Lusanji-Waswa (born 28 December 1971) is a retired Kenyan female volleyball player. She was part of the Kenya women's national volleyball team.

She competed with the national team at the 2000 Summer Olympics in Sydney, Australia, finishing 11th. She participated in the 2002 FIVB Volleyball Women's World Championship.

See also
 Kenya at the 2000 Summer Olympics

References

External links
 
 http://allafrica.com/stories/200009190228.html
 http://www.fivb.ch/vis_web/volley/wwch2002/pdf/match043.pdf
 http://www.todor66.com/volleyball/World/Women_1998.html
 http://www.todor66.com/volleyball/Olympics/Women_2000.html

1971 births
Living people
Kenyan women's volleyball players
Place of birth missing (living people)
Volleyball players at the 2000 Summer Olympics
Olympic volleyball players of Kenya